Latanoprost, sold under the brand name Xalatan among others, is a medication used to treat increased pressure inside the eye. This includes ocular hypertension and open angle glaucoma. It is applied as eye drops to the eyes. Onset of effects is usually within four hours, and they last for up to a day.

Common side effects include blurry vision, redness of the eye, itchiness, and darkening of the iris. Latanoprost is in the prostaglandin analogue family of medications. It works by increasing the outflow of aqueous fluid from the eyes through the uveoscleral tract.

Latanoprost was approved for medical use in the United States in 1996. It is on the World Health Organization's List of Essential Medicines. Latanoprost is available as a generic medication. In 2020, it was the 77th most commonly prescribed medication in the United States with more than 9million prescriptions. It is available as a combination with netarsudil and with timolol.

Medical uses

Open-angle glaucoma

In people with ocular hypertension (intraocular pressure (IOP) ≥21 mm Hg) including open-angle glaucoma, treatment with latanoprost reduced IOP levels by 22 to 39% over 1 to 12 months’ treatment. Latanoprost more effective than timolol 0.5% twice daily in 3 of 4 large (n = 163 to 267) randomised, double-blind trials. Latanoprost demonstrated a stable long-term IOP-lowering effect in 1- or 2-year continuations of these trials, with no sign of diminishing effect during prolonged treatment.

Meta-analysis suggests that latanoprost is more effective than timolol in lowering intraocular pressure (IOP). However, it often causes iris pigmentation. While current evidence suggests that this pigmentation is benign, careful lifetime evaluation of patients is still justified.

Closed-angle glaucoma
Patients who had elevated IOP despite iridotomy and/or iridectomy (including patients of Asian descent), latanoprost was significantly more effective than timolol in two double-blind, monotherapy trials (8.2 and 8.8 mm Hg vs 5.2 and 5.7 mm Hg for latanoprost vs timolol at 12 and 2 weeks, respectively).

Adverse effects
Listed from most to least common:

 > 5–15%: blurred vision, burning and stinging, conjunctival hyperemia, foreign body sensation, itching, increased (brown) pigmentation of the iris (causing heterochromia), punctate epithelial keratopathy
 4%: cold or upper respiratory tract infections, flu-like syndrome
 1–4%: dry eyes, excessive tearing, eye pain, lid crusting, lid edema, lid erythema (hyperemia), lid pain, photophobia
 1–2%: chest pain, allergic skin reactions, arthralgia, back pain, myalgia
 < 1 % (only severe or life-threatening effects): asthma, herpes keratitis, iritis, keratitis, retinal artery embolus, retinal detachment, toxic epidermal necrolysis, uveitis, vitreous hemorrhage from diabetic retinopathy
A single case report links latanoprost use to the progression of keratoconus.

Research suggests that wiping the eye with an absorbent pad after the administration of eye drops can result in shorter eyelashes and a lesser chance of hyperpigmentation in the eyelid, compared to not wiping off excess fluid.

Pregnancy
Use in pregnant women is limited due to high incidence of abortion shown in animal experiments. Because of this, latanoprost is classified as risk factor C (adverse events were observed in animal reproduction studies at maternally toxic doses) according to United States Food and Drug Administration's use-in-pregnancy ratings. Drug excretion in breast milk is unknown.

Interactions
Interactions are similar to other prostaglandin analogs. Paradoxically, the concomitant use of latanoprost and bimatoprost or other prostaglandins may result in increased intraocular pressure.
Non-steroidal anti-inflammatory drugs (NSAIDs) can reduce or increase the effect of latanoprost.

Pharmacology

Mechanism of action
Like tafluprost and travoprost, latanoprost is an ester prodrug that is activated to the free acid in the cornea. Also like the related drugs, latanoprost acid is an analog of prostaglandin F2α that acts as a selective agonist at the prostaglandin F receptor.  Prostaglandins increase the sclera's permeability to aqueous fluid. So, an increase in prostaglandin activity increases outflow of aqueous fluid thus lowering intraocular pressure.

Pharmacokinetics
Latanoprost is absorbed well through the cornea and completely hydrolysed to the active latanoprost acid. Highest concentrations of the acid in the aqueous humour are reached two hours after application, lowering of intraocular pressure starts after 3 to 4 hours, the highest effect is found after 8 to 12 hours, and its action lasts at least 24 hours. When latanoprost acid reaches the circulation, it is quickly metabolised in the liver by beta oxidation to 1,2-dinor- and 1,2,3,4-tetranor-latanoprost acid; blood plasma half life is only 17 minutes. The metabolites are mainly excreted via the kidney.

The activation and deactivation pathway is analogous to the one of tafluprost (at least up to the tetranor-metabolite); compare Tafluprost#Pharmacokinetics.

Chemistry

Stability
Latanoprost exhibits thermal and solar instability. The concentration of latanoprost stored at 50 °C will decrease by 10% every 8.25 days. When stored at 70 °C the concentration will decrease by 10% every 1.32 days. Ultraviolet light, for example in sunlight, causes rapid degradation of latanoprost.

Society and culture
The brand Xalatan is manufactured by Pfizer.

Cosmetic use
 Lengthening and thickening of the eyelashes (used, like bimatoprost, in the cosmetic industry as eyelash growth enhancers).
 There is one small study that found benefit in androgenic alopecia.

References

External links
 

Alkene derivatives
Carboxylate esters
Cyclopropanes
Hair loss medications
Isopropyl esters
Ophthalmology drugs
Pfizer brands
Prostaglandins
Triols
World Health Organization essential medicines
Wikipedia medicine articles ready to translate